Desiderata (minor planet designation: 344 Desiderata) is a very large main-belt asteroid. It is classified as a C-type asteroid and is probably composed of carbonaceous material.

It was discovered by Auguste Charlois on 15 November 1892, in Nice.

References

External links 
 
 

000344
Discoveries by Auguste Charlois
Named minor planets
000344
18921115